Edward Vollmer (June 1, 1877 - ?) was an American politician who was a member of the Wisconsin State Assembly in Wisconsin during the 1921 Session. He was a Republican.

Vollmer went to Spencerian Business School, learn telegraphy, and worked in his father's grocery business. He was the chief timekeeper at the Milwaukee plant to the Illinois Steel Company.

References

Politicians from Milwaukee
1877 births
Year of death unknown
Republican Party members of the Wisconsin State Assembly